Neil Critchley (born 18 October 1978) is an English former footballer who played in the Football League First Division for Crewe Alexandra. He was most recently the head coach of EFL Championship side Queens Park Rangers. 

He has previously managed Liverpool under-18s (standing in for Jürgen Klopp for two of Liverpool's cup fixtures in the 2019–2020 season), and guided Blackpool to promotion, via the playoffs, from League One to the Championship in 2020–21, his first full season in charge of the club.

He is one of sixteen coaches worldwide to have obtained UEFA's elite badge.

Playing career

Crewe Alexandra
Critchley, aged 10, joined Crewe in 1989. The club was then managed by Dario Gradi who had recently started a player development scheme that became the Crewe Alexandra F.C. Academy. Gradi noticed Critchley's ability, even at the age of 17, to coach younger players and encouraged him to become more fully involved.

Critchley's only playing appearance for Crewe came in a 3–0 defeat away at Fulham during the 1999–2000 season.

Leigh RMI
He signed for Leigh RMI in 2000, and made three league appearances as substitute for the club.

Coaching and managerial career
Critchley retired as a player aged 24 and became a coach at Crewe, working under Gradi and Steve Holland, and being appointed joint Academy director in 2007, before joining Liverpool as under-18s coach in 2013.

Liverpool
Due to fixture congestion of Liverpool's first team during the 2019–20 season, Critchley served as their stand-in manager for their EFL Cup away match against Aston Villa on 17 December 2019. The congestion was caused by Liverpool's participation in the 2019 FIFA Club World Cup in Qatar, which overlapped with the EFL Cup quarter-finals. Liverpool, fielding a team made up exclusively of under-23s, were beaten 5–0. Critchley again served as Liverpool's stand-in manager for the FA Cup fourth round replay against Shrewsbury Town on 4 February 2020, as the first team were on a mid-season break. The youthful Liverpool team won 1–0 via an own goal.

Blackpool
On 2 March 2020, Critchley was appointed as head coach of Blackpool on a three-and-a-half-year contract. After a curtailed regular season due to the COVID-19 pandemic in the United Kingdom, Blackpool finished in 13th position after standings were amended to reflect a points-per-game ratio.

In Critchley's first full season in charge, 2020–21, Blackpool finished third at the conclusion of the regular season, going on to win promotion via the EFL League One play-offs.

On 19 November 2021, Critchley signed a four-year extension to his contract, keeping him at Bloomfield Road until 2026. The following week, Critchley was named Manager of the Season at the annual North West Football Awards, beating Manchester City's Pep Guardiola, Blackpool's former captain and now Bolton Wanderers manager Ian Evatt, and Morecambe manager Derek Adams.

Aston Villa (assistant) 
On 2 June 2022, Critchley departed Blackpool after accepting the role of assistant head coach to Steven Gerrard at Aston Villa. He had told Blackpool's owner Simon Sadler that he was keen to work again with Gerrard and "pit himself against some of the best coaches in the world".

On 21 October 2022, Critchley departed Aston Villa, following the sacking of Gerrard the day prior.

Queens Park Rangers
On 11 December 2022, Critchley was appointed head coach of Championship club Queens Park Rangers on a three-and-a-half year deal. His first match in charge was a single-goal victory over Preston North End.

On 19 February 2023, Critchley was relieved of his duties as head coach of Queen's Park Rangers, with the victory over Preston North End being the team's sole victory during his time in charge.

Managerial statistics

Honours 
Blackpool

 EFL League One play-offs: 2021

Personal life
Critchley is married to Janine.

References

External links
 (playing stats)
Neil Critchley at Soccerbase (managerial stats)

1978 births
Living people
English footballers
Association football midfielders
Crewe Alexandra F.C. players
English Football League players
Leigh Genesis F.C. players
National League (English football) players
Liverpool F.C. non-playing staff
Liverpool F.C. managers
Blackpool F.C. managers
Queens Park Rangers F.C. managers
Aston Villa F.C. non-playing staff
English football managers
Crewe Alexandra F.C. non-playing staff
Association football coaches